Badia Pavese (Lombard: Casél) is a comune (municipality) in the Province of Pavia in the Italian region Lombardy, located about 45 km southeast of Milan and about 25 km southeast of Pavia. As of 31 December 2004, it had a population of 435 and an area of 5.0 km².

Badia Pavese borders the following municipalities: Chignolo Po, Monticelli Pavese, Pieve Porto Morone, Santa Cristina e Bissone.

Demographic evolution

References 

Cities and towns in Lombardy